Harasgna is a former Tongva-Gabrieleño Native American settlement in Los Angeles County, California. Its precise location is unknown.

It was listed as one of twenty seven rancherias, as the Spanish referred to them, or villages in the records of Mission San Gabriel, along with numerous other villages, alphabetically between Hahamongna and Houtgna.

According to one source, Hubert Howe Bancroft, the name referred to San Clemente Island, rather than a village. An essay by Gustav Eisen in 1915 wrote, "the Indians on the island were known as 'Kinkapar' and the island itself as Harasgna."

See also
Lupukngna
Toviscanga
Yaanga
:Category: Tongva populated places
Tongva language
California mission clash of cultures
Ranchos in California

References

Former settlements in Los Angeles County, California
Former Native American populated places in California
Former populated places in California
Tongva populated places